Miloš Mijić (born 22 November 1989) is a Serbian football midfielder who plays for Maltese club Balzan.

External links
 
 Miloš Mijić stats at utakmica.rs

1989 births
Living people
Footballers from Belgrade
Association football midfielders
Serbian footballers
Serbian expatriate footballers
FK Radnički Nova Pazova players
FK Hajduk Beograd players
OFK Beograd players
FK Donji Srem players
FK Novi Pazar players
FK Mladost Lučani players
FK Metalac Gornji Milanovac players
FK Napredak Kruševac players
FK Radnik Surdulica players
NK Domžale players
FK Sloboda Tuzla players
FK Budućnost Podgorica players
Balzan F.C. players
Serbian SuperLiga players
Slovenian PrvaLiga players
Montenegrin First League players
Premier League of Bosnia and Herzegovina players
Maltese Premier League players
Serbian expatriate sportspeople in Slovenia
Serbian expatriate sportspeople in Montenegro
Serbian expatriate sportspeople in Bosnia and Herzegovina
Serbian expatriate sportspeople in Malta
Expatriate footballers in Slovenia
Expatriate footballers in Montenegro
Expatriate footballers in Bosnia and Herzegovina
Expatriate footballers in Malta